The Great Britain women's national rugby league team, also known as the Great Britain Lionesses, represents Great Britain in Women's rugby league. They are administered by the Rugby Football League. The Great Britain Lionesses have placed third in every Women's Rugby League World Cup in which they have competed. In 2006, the RFL announced that after the 2007 All Golds Tour the Great Britain team would no longer compete on a regular basis, and that players would be able to represent England, Wales and Scotland at Test level. It is planned that the Great Britain team will come together in future only for occasional tours, same as the Great Britain Lions.

Results

Notes:
 A Great Britain women's rugby league team toured France in 1989 but played only touch football games against French women. They did play a tackle match against a men's Under 21 team, losing 4–10.
 There is a possibility that women's internationals were played between Great Britain and France between the 2000 and 2003 World Cups. The 2000 World Cup programme lists previous Test series occurring between 1995 and 1999. An article previewing the 2007 match between England and France mentions that it was the first international to be played by an English or Great Britain side since the 2003 World Cup.
 Since the mid-2000s, English players have competed internationally as England.

History

1996 Tour of Australia
The Great Britain Lionesses toured Australia for the first time in 1996. The team was captained by Lisa McIntosh, with Brenda Dobek as vice-captain. Ian Harris (Hull) was head coach with Jackie Sheldon as assistant coach. Nikki Carter (Hull Vixens) was tour manager. Paula Clark (York) was the touring team's physiotherapist.

Great Britain lost the inaugural Test Match against Australia, but won both of the subsequent two Test Matches to claim a two-one series victory.

The playing group consisted of captain Lisa McIntosh (Dudley Hill, squad number 13), vice-captain Brenda Dobek (Wakefield Panthers, squad number 6) and the following: 
16. Jill Adams (Redhill), 17. Jane Banks (Wigan St Patricks), 1. Sharon Birkenhead (Redhill), 4. Karen Burrows (Redhill), 5. Wendy Charnley (Rochdale), 20. Julie Cronin (York), 
22. Lucy Ferguson (Wakefield Panthers), 7. Mandy Green (Dudley Hill), 18. Nicki Harrison (Dudley Hill), 21. Joanne Hewson (Askam), 15. Lisa Hunter (Hull), 23. Allison Kitchin (Barrow), 3. Liz Kitchin (Barrow), 9. Michelle Land (Wakefield Panthers), 25. Sally Milburn (Askam), 8. Donna Parker (Hull Vixens), 2. Chantel Patricks (Dudley Hill), 24. Samantha Pearson (Dudley Hill), 26. Joanne Roberts (Wakefield Panthers), 11. Lucia Scott (Rochdale), 14. Vicky Studd (Dudley Hill), 19. Paula Tunnicliffe (Rochdale), 12. Sandra Wade (Barrow) and 1. Joanna Will (Wakefield Panthers).

1998 Tour of New Zealand
The Great Britain Lionesses toured New Zealand for the first time in 1998. The team was captained by Lisa McIntosh and coached by Jackie Sheldon.

2002  Tour of Australia
In 2002 Great Britain Lionesses toured Australia with sponsorship from Munchies.

The playing group, captained by Lisa McIntosh (Bradford Thunderbirds), consisted of Samantha Bailey (Sheffield), Jane Banks (Bradford), Nicola Benstead (Hull Dockers), Teresa Bruce (Bradford Thunderbirds), Sue Cochrane (Wakefield Panthers), Brenda Dobek (Wakefield Panthers), Becky Jones (Hillside Hawks), Alexandra Knight (Keighley), Michelle Land (Wakefield Panthers), Paula McCourt (Wakefield Panthers), Sally Millburn (Barrow), Nikki O'Donnell (Hull Dockers), Natalie Parsons (Bradford Thunderbirds), Chantel Patrick (Bradford Thunderbirds), Nicholette Postlethwaite (Wigan Ladies), Donna Prime (Hull Dockers), Debbie Rice (Hull Dockers), Kirsty Robinson (Bradford Thunderbirds), Amy Robinson (Hull Dockers), Nicola Simpson (Milford Storm), Rebecca Stevens (Sheffield), Danni Titterington (Wakefield Panthers), Gemma Walsh (Wakefield Panthers) and Rachael Wilson (Wakefield Panthers).

The team was coached by Jackie Sheldon, with John Mitchell (Bradford Thunderbirds) and Dylan Reynard (Milford) serving as assistant coaches. The touring party was managed by Roland Davis and Andrew McDonald (Keighley). Elaine Kirton (Whitehaven) was on tour as physiotherapist.

2010s 
A 2015 Great Britain Lionesses tour of Australasia was approved by the RLIF, however did not occur.  During the decade, England women's teams visited France for away matches, travelled to Australia for the 2017 World Cup and in 2019 toured Papua New Guinea and participated in a four-team international nines competition.

See also

Great Britain men's national rugby league team
England women's national rugby league team
Scotland women's national rugby league team
Wales women's national rugby league team
Ireland women's national rugby league team

References

External links

Women's national rugby league teams
rugby league